The Cyber Civil Rights Initiative (CCRI) is a non-profit organization founded by Holly Jacobs in 2012. The organization offers services to victims of cybercrimes through its crisis helpline. They have compiled resources to help victims of cybercrimes both in America and internationally.  CCRI's resources include a list of frequently asked questions, an online image removal guide, a roster of attorneys who may be able to offer low-cost or pro-bono legal assistance, and a list of laws related to nonconsensual pornography and related issues. CCRI publishes reports on nonconsensual pornography, engages in advocacy work, and contributes to updating tech policy. CCRI offers expert advice to tech industry leaders such as Twitter, Facebook, and Google regarding their policies against nonconsensual pornography. CCRI is the lead educator in the United States on subject matter related to nonconsensual pornography, recorded sexual assault, and sextortion.

Leadership
Holly Jacobs is the founder and a board member. Previously, she served as CCRI's President and Executive Director.

Dr. Mary Anne Franks is CCRI's President, Legislative and Tech Policy Director.
Dr. Franks is a law professor at the University of Miami School of Law and an expert in First Amendment law, Second Amendment law, privacy, cyberlaw, and criminal law and procedure. Dr. Franks drafted the first model criminal statute on nonconsensual pornography, which has been used as a template by many states as well as for pending federal legislation. Dr. Franks is also the author of The Cult of the Constitution: Our Deadly Devotion to Guns and Free Speech (Stanford Press, 2019).

Danielle Citron is CCRI's Vice President and Secretary. Prof. Citron teaches law at the University of Virginia School of Law. She is an expert in information privacy, free expression, and civil rights law. In 2019, Prof. Citron was named a Mac Arthur Fellow for her work on sexual privacy and cyberstalking. She is the author of Hate Crimes in Cyberspace (Harvard University Press). Prof. Citron and Dr. Franks have co-authored a piece titled Criminalizing Revenge Porn in the Wake Forest Law Review which was the first law review article to take on the topic and its challenges.

CCRI's board members also include Dr. Hany Farid who is a professor at the University of California, Berkeley, with a joint appointment in Electrical Engineering & Computer Science and the School of Information. Dr. Farid brings to CCRI his expertise in misinformation and digital forensics.

Dr. Safiya Noble is also a member of CCRI's board, she brings to the organization her expertise on the design of digital media and its impact on society with a focus on racist, gendered, and biased algorithms. Dr. Safiya is the author of Algorithms of Oppression: How Search Engines Reinforce Racism. Dr. Safiya is also the recipient of a Hellman Fellowship and the UCLA Early Career Award.

Ari Ezra Waldman is a professor of law and computer science at Northeastern University School of Law, who also serves on CCRI's board. Prof. Waldman's work focuses on asymmetrical power relations rooted in law and technology. His expertise focuses on privacy, online harassment, free speech and the LGBTQ community. Prof. Waldman is the author of Privacy As Trust: Information Privacy for an Information Age (Cambridge University Press, 2018) and Inside the Information Industry (Cambridge University Press, forthcoming 2021). In 2020, Prof. Waldman was also named one of 2020's Top Fifty Thinkers by Prospect Magazine for his work on privacy in the digital age, technology and sociology.

References

External links
Official website

Cyberbullying
Internet safety
Sexual abuse victims advocacy
Sexual harassment
Non-profit organizations based in Florida